The Governor of Formosa is a citizen of the Formosa Province, in Argentina, holding the office of governor for the corresponding period. The governor is elected alongside a vice-governor. Since 1995, the governor of Formosa has been Gildo Insfrán. Having held office uninterruptedly for  years now, Insfrán is the longest-serving governor currently in office in Argentina.

Governors since 1983

See also 
 Chamber of Deputies of Formosa

References

Formosa Province
Formosa Province